Arena Toruń is a multi-purpose sports and entertainment arena in Toruń, Kuyavian-Pomeranian Voivodeship, Poland. It is home to Twarde Pierniki Toruń of the Polish Basketball League (PLK).
It was officially opened on 10 August 2014.

History
In 2010, the general project of the venue was presented by a consortium of DEDECO and MD Polska companies. Construction of the building commenced in 2011. It is located in Chełmińskie Przedmieście, the western part of the city. The total cost of the venue reached 158 million PLN. The building's dimensions are 162.25 meters (length), 97.10 meters (width) and 20 meters (height). Arena Toruń was opened on 10 August 2014.

Since 2015, the venue has been hosting the Copernicus Cup, an IAAF World Indoor Tour meeting.

The venue also hosted the 2021 European Athletics Indoor Championships from 4 to 7 March 2021.

Gallery

See also
List of indoor arenas in Poland
Sport in Poland

References

Sports venues completed in 2014
Indoor arenas in Poland
Basketball venues in Poland
Music venues in Poland